Pokémon: The First Movie is a 1998 Japanese anime fantasy adventure film directed by Kunihiko Yuyama. It is the first theatrical release in the Pokémon franchise. The film was first released in Japan on July 18, 1998. In addition to an added prologue, the updated version included new animation and CGI graphics. The film primarily consists of three segments: Pikachu's Vacation, a 21-minute feature focusing on the series mascot Pikachu; Origin of Mewtwo, the 10-minute prologue added to the extended version of the film; and Mewtwo Strikes Back, the main 75-minute film feature. Overseas, the prologue can only be seen as a bonus short in DVD versions of Pokémon: Mewtwo Returns. The events of the film take place during the first season of Pokémon: Indigo League. The English-language adaptation was released in North America on November 12, 1999, by Warner Bros.

In Japan, the film received positive reviews, with praise directed at the film's emotional impact and exploration of ethical topics such as cloning, genetic modification and existentialism. However, the English-language version received generally negative reviews from film critics, with much of the criticism pointed at the poor voice acting and its inclusion of an anti-violence message despite it being a Pokémon film. Further retrospective criticism of the English-language version has been targeted against the removal of most of the ethical topics, such as part of Mewtwo's origin story. It also sold 10million home video units in the United States, including 4.2million VHS sales that earned  in 2000.

During the end credits of Pokémon the Movie: The Power of Us (2018), it was announced that a full CGI remake was set to release on the following year. It was released as Pokémon: Mewtwo Strikes Back — Evolution in July 2019.

Plot

Pikachu's Vacation 
The Pokémon of Ash Ketchum, Misty, and Brock are sent to spend a day at a theme park built for Pokémon. Pikachu, Togepi, Psyduck, Bulbasaur, and Squirtle cross paths with a group of bullies consisting of a Raichu, Cubone, Marill, and Snubbull. The two groups compete against each other, but it leads to Ash's Charizard getting its head stuck in a pipe. Pikachu, his friends, and the bullies work together and successfully free Charizard and rebuild the park, spending the rest of the day playing before parting ways when their trainers return.

The Uncut Story of Mewtwo's Origin 
Scientist Dr. Fuji is hired by Giovanni, leader of Team Rocket, to utilize his expertise in cloning in order to create a living weapon based on an eyelash from the mythical Pokémon Mew. Fuji is revealed to be allying with Giovanni as a means to fund his side project: the resurrection of his deceased daughter Amber. In a laboratory, the weapon eventually gains sentience and is named Mewtwo. Mewtwo befriends the salvaged consciousness of Amber, named Ambertwo, as well as the clones of other Pokémon in the laboratory. However, Mewtwo is left deeply traumatized after Ambertwo and the rest of the clones decompose and die. To stabilize him, Fuji tranquilizes Mewtwo, causing him to forget the time he spent with his friends.

Mewtwo Strikes Back 
After Mewtwo fully matures and awakens from a long slumber in a laboratory on New Island, he learns of his origin as Mew's clone from Dr. Fuji. Infuriated that Fuji and his colleagues see him as nothing more than an experiment, he unleashes his incredibly strong psychic abilities and telekinetically destroys the laboratory, killing Fuji and the rest of the scientists. Giovanni, witnessing the carnage afar, approaches and convinces Mewtwo to work with him to further develop and perfect his mental abilities. However, after Mewtwo learns of his purpose to be a weapon for Giovanni's benefit, he escapes back to New Island, where he plots revenge against humanity and Pokémon alike.

After Mewtwo rebuilds the laboratory and establishes a base there, he invites several trainers with hologram messages to battle the world's greatest Pokémon trainer at New Island. Ash, Misty, and Brock receive a message and accept the invitation, but when they arrive at the port city, Old Shore Wharf, Mewtwo creates a storm, causing the boats on the wharf to be closed off for safety. As a result, Ash's group is picked up by Team Rocket disguised as Vikings on a boat. After the storm sinks their vessel in the middle of the ocean, Ash and his friends use their Pokémon instead to reach New Island.

Escorted into the island's palace by the woman who appeared on the hologram, Ash and the other trainers who were able to reach the island encounter Mewtwo. The woman is revealed to be a brainwashed Nurse Joy after she is released from Mewtwo's mind control. Mewtwo challenges the trainers using cloned Pokémon coincidentally modeled after the deceased friends from his childhood. Meanwhile, Team Rocket also reached New Island and explores its inner sanctum, with a Mew innocuously following them. After Mewtwo's clones effortlessly defeat the challengers' Pokémon, he confiscates them and expands his clone army. Ash chases after his captured Pikachu down to the cloning lab, where Team Rocket's Meowth is also cloned. Ash destroys the cloning machine, frees the captured Pokémon, and leads them to confront Mewtwo and his clones. Mew then reveals itself, and Mewtwo challenges it to prove his superiority.

All the Pokémon originals battle their clones, save for a defiant Pikachu and Meowth, who makes peace with his clone after realizing the senselessness of their fighting. Horrified at the pain and anguish felt on both sides of the battle, Ash puts himself in between a psychic blast caused by Mewtwo and Mew's fighting, leading to Ash becoming petrified. Pikachu tries to revive Ash with his electricity, but fails. However, the tears of the Pokémon revive Ash. Moved by Ash's sacrifice, Mewtwo realizes that he should not have to be judged by his origins, but rather by his choices in life. Departing with Mew and the clones, Mewtwo turns back time to just before the trainers leave Old Shore Wharf, and erases everyone's memories of the event.

Back in Old Shore Wharf, the now-restored Nurse Joy has returned to reopen the Pokémon Center to shelter the trainers. The storm outside clears up, Ash spots Mew flying through the clouds and tells his friends of how he saw another legendary Pokémon the day he left Pallet Town. Meanwhile, Team Rocket find themselves stranded on New Island, unable to remember how they got there, but enjoy their time nonetheless.

Cast 

Additional voices:

 Japanese: Rikako Aikawa (Zenigame/Koduck/Rokon/Seadra/Golduck), Tomohisa Asō (Co-Investigator), Unshō Ishizuka (Gyarados/Iwark/Kingler/Koiking/Matadogas), Hidenari Ugaki (Researcher), Hiroshi Ōtake (Okorizaru), Ikue Ōtani (Tosakinto), Ryūzaburō Ōtomo (Bernard), Mitsuru Ogata (Kairyu), Mika Kanai (Purin), Tesshō Genda (Kusukusu/Kusukusu's clone), Katsuyuki Konishi (Scientist/Nidoking/Sihorn/Kentauros), Kōichi Sakaguchi (Arbok), Chiyako Shibahara (Nyarth's clone), Akio Suyama (Researcher), Tomoe Hanba (Lucky), Megumi Hayashibara (Fushigidane/Pikachu's clone/Pigeon), Shin'ichirō Miki (Lizardon/Hitodeman/Windie/Lizardon's clone)
 English: Rikako Aikawa (Seadra/Golduck), Addie Blaustein (Alakazam), Eric Grossfeld, Michael J. Haigney (Psyduck/Bruteroot/Nidoqueen/Shellshocker/Dewgong/Bruteroot's clone/Shellshocker's clone/Raticate/Spearow), Unshō Ishizuka (Gyarados/Onix/Kingler), Tara Jayne (Bulbasaur/Vulpix/Bulbasaur's clone/Oddish), Rachael Lillis (Jigglypuff/Wigglytuff), Mitsuru Ogata (Dragonite), Hiroshi Ōtake (Primeape), Ed Paul (Scientist), Kayzie Rogers (Vaporeon/Vileplume/Ninetales), Kōichi Sakaguchi (Arbok), Eric Stuart (Squirtle/Squirtle's clone/Weezing/Exeggutor/Slowpoke/Scyther/Hitmonlee/Tentacruel/Magneton/Scientist), Veronica Taylor (Scientist/Computer/Diglett)

Production 
Kunihiko Yuyama directed the original Japanese version of the film, while Choji Yoshikawa and Takeshi Shudo served as producer and script writer respectively. The film was not produced by Pikachu Project. According to Shudo, certain episodes in the anime were intended to tie-in with the movie prior to its release in Japan and provide background behind the events in the film. However, the controversy surrounding the "Dennō Senshi Porygon" episode delayed the tie-in episodes, causing Shudo to expand the beginning of the movie and, thus, the length of the film.

Themes 
Shudo explained in his blog that Mewtwo being torn over his life purpose reflects the film's theme of existentialism. In the Japanese script, for instance, the moment Mewtwo realizes he has a right to be in the world just as much as any other living creature represents the central message of accepting one's existence. Amber, who is named Ai (アイ) in the Japanese script, was named so to highlight the film's overall message of self-existence, with Ai being a homonym of the English word "I".

English-language adaptation 
Norman J. Grossfeld, former president of 4Kids Productions, served as the film's producer for the English-language North American version. Grossfeld, Michael Haigney, and John Touhey wrote the English adaptation, and Haigney served as the English version's voice director. The English script was heavily edited from the original Japanese one; along with various content edits, Mewtwo was portrayed more maliciously because Grossfeld felt American audiences needed to see a "clearly evil" villain rather than a morally ambiguous one. As such, the existential themes seen in the Japanese version were significantly toned-down.

The English version editors translated various Japanese texts, including those on signs and on buildings, into English. The Shogakukan-Shueisha Productions (formerly Shogakukan Productions) also altered various background from the original version of the film in order to enhance its presentation overseas. In the English dub, three Pokémon are referred to by the wrong name. Pidgeot was called "Pidgeotto", Scyther was called "Alakazam", and Sandslash was called "Sandshrew". 4Kids said that they decided to leave the latter two errors when they noticed it as something for the children watching to notice and because they felt it was plausible in context that Team Rocket could make a mistake.

Grossfeld also had new music re-recorded for the film's release, citing that it "would better reflect what American kids would respond to". John Loeffler of Rave Music produced the English-language music and co-composed the film score with Ralph Schuckett. Loeffler also collaborated with John Lissauer and Manny Corallo to produce the English-language "Pikachu's Vacation" score. Grossfeld also revealed that the English version of the film "combines the visual sense of the best Japanese animation with the musical sensibility of Western pop culture". Grossfeld revealed in a 2022 interview that while shopping the film around to distributors, one studio suggested having Leonardo DiCaprio dub over Ash's lines, a decision Grossfeld found "weird". Ultimately, he managed to work out a deal with Warner Bros.

Marketing

Burger King promotion 
Burger King released a limited series of kids' meal toys to tie in with the film. Also promoted were six 23 karat gold Pokémon cards, each enclosed inside a large plastic Poké Ball. Every card is a 23 karat gold plated slab of metal inside a clear protective plastic case that came with a certificate of authenticity signed by Nintendo of America chairman Howard Lincoln. The first run of gold cards sent and released to Burger King locations were packaged in a limited blue box that sold out immediately. A large second print of gold cards were packaged in a red box until the film promotion ended.

Controversy 

On December 11, 1999, 13-month-old Kira Murphy from California suffocated to death when half of the toy became stuck over her mouth and nose, causing her to suffocate, and was later found deceased in her playpen. Twelve days later, a second child in Kansas survived a similar incident. These incidents led to a website titled "Pokémon Kills". On December 28, 1999, Burger King issued a recall of the toys. Adults were urged to discard or return both pieces of the toy. Customers returning the toy were given a small order of french fries in return. Nearly a month after the recall, another child suffocated from the toy. The dead children's families settled their lawsuits on undisclosed terms.

Manga 
Toshihiro Ono, author of Pokémon: The Electric Tale of Pikachu, created a manga version of the film. Asked by editors to draw Mewtwo's birth, he received the source material to base the manga off of in April 1998 and finished the manga in May. In July of that year, a five episode radio drama titled The Birth of Mewtwo was broadcast over the five Sundays leading up to the premiere of the movie in Japan. Written by Takeshi Shudo, the drama delves into Mewtwo's origin prior to the start of the film. It also explores the leadership of Team Rocket under Madame Boss, Giovanni's mother, and the last known whereabouts of Miyamoto (ミヤモト), Jesse's mother. Due to its mature themes, it was never dubbed in English. The drama eventually served the basis for the Origin of Mewtwo prologue that would appear in the extended version of the film. Since the drama was conceived a few months after the manga, the events depicted in the drama do not match up with the events portrayed in the manga. Ono has even stated that "there's not much connection between the manga and the movie".

Soundtrack 

Pokémon: The First Movie – Music from and Inspired by the Motion Picture is the soundtrack to the first Pokémon film in the United States. It was released on November 10, 1999, on compact disc and cassette tape. "Don't Say You Love Me" by M2M was released as a single from the album, and it would later be featured on their debut studio album Shades of Purple.

Trailers 
In the United States, the first trailer was released in August 1999 and was shown before The Iron Giant and Mystery Men. The second trailer was released in late 1999 and was attached to The Bachelor. In addition, select theaters gave away exclusive Pokémon trading cards to capitalize on the success of the trading card game. The cards featured likenesses of Electabuzz, Pikachu, Mewtwo, and Dragonite and were dispensed in random order for each week it was in that particular theater. The subsequent releases of Pokémon: The Movie 2000 and Pokémon 3: The Movie featured a similar marketing campaign. For the March 2000 home video release of The First Movie, had TV, in-school, and internet ads with companies such as Clorox, Kraft and Zenith Electronics, a contest to win a trip to Japan, and a limited edition Mewtwo card (different from that used for the theatrical release) was packaged with the video.

Release 
The Japanese version of the film was initially distributed theatrically by Toho on July 18, 1998. That following year, the English-dub of film was distributed by Warner Bros. Pictures and released in the United States on November 12, 1999, with a November 6 premiere at Mann's Chinese Theater in Hollywood. The film was theatrically re-released exclusively at Cinemark theaters in the United States on October 29 and November 1, 2016. The re-release included the Pikachu's Vacation short film from the original release and was intended to commemorate Pokémon'''s 20th anniversary.

 Broadcast airing 
For TV syndication, the movie was digitally remastered for high definition and aired in TV Tokyo, as well as in other stations, beginning May 3, 2013. The remastered version also aired in Cartoon Network in the United States on January 4, 2014.

 Home media 
The movie was released on March 21, 2000, in Region 1 format (United States and Canada) on both VHS and DVD by Warner Home Video. The original DVD release with the snap case contained numerous features deleted from later reprints, such as the origin prologue and the Pikachu's Vacation short film. Other options, such as Dolby Digital 5.1 sound, were also removed, leaving only the 2.0 stereo mix available, among other features.

The original VHS release sold 4.2million units and earned  in the United States by the end of 2000. By 2007, the film had sold 10million units on home video in the United States.

The film was included in the Blu-ray compilation titled Pikachu Movie Premium 1998-2010 in Japan on November 28, 2012.

On February 9, 2016, Viz Media and Warner Home Video released a limited edition Blu-ray steelbook containing the Pokémon films Pokémon: The First Movie, Pokémon the Movie 2000, and Pokémon 3: The Movie, along with single releases on DVD. In accommodation with the 20th anniversary of the Pokémon franchise, a digitally remastered version of the film was released on digital stores on February 27. On October 2, 2018, the three-film Blu-ray set was re-released as a standard one-disc edition.

 Reception 
 Critical response 
Reviews of the original Japanese version have generally been positive, due to the film's emotional impact and exploration of ethical topics such as cloning and genetic engineering. However, the philosophical themes were criticized for being too complex for children.

While the English dub of the film received decent reviews from audiences, it received generally negative reviews from critics. On review aggregator Rotten Tomatoes, 16% of critics have given the film's English adaptation a positive review based on 91 reviews, with an average rating of 3.57/10. The website's critics' consensus reads, "Audiences other than children will find very little to entertain them." On Metacritic, the film has a weighted average score of 35 out of 100 based on 25 critics, indicating "generally unfavorable reviews". Audiences polled by CinemaScore gave the film an average grade of "A−" on an A+ to F scale.

Anime News Network review called the main feature "contradictory", stating that "the anti-violent message that is pretty much crammed down our throats works directly against the entire point of the franchise" and criticized Pikachu's Summer Vacation for being "incoherent, pointless and fluffy". Rating the movie two stars out of four, Roger Ebert of the Chicago Sun-Times called the movie "a sound-and-light show, linked to the marketing push for Pokémon in general" and said that the movie had "no level at which it enriches a young viewer, by encouraging thinking or observation." Michael Wood of the Coventry Evening Telegraph said that Pikachu's Summer Vacation "can only be described as a mind-numbingly tedious piece, with no discernible storyline and lots of trippy images and silly voices". Wood did note that the main feature had a "mildly intriguing premise", but said that the rest of the film "was like a martial arts movie without the thrills". 

Retrospective reviews written several years after the release of the film have criticized the narrative changes made during the localization process, such as the omission of the extended-prologue detailing Mewtwo's origin and script changes that paint Mewtwo as an "oversimplified villain". Commenting on the English-language script of the film, Ryan Lambie of Den of Geek described the decision to cut Mewtwo's origin "a highly unfortunate move" and that the original Japanese script allowed for "a far more engrossing watch" due to its deeper exploration of mature, existential themes. Lambie also commented, however, that "the various edits made to its dialogue and story probably didn't mean much" to younger fans at the time of the movie's release, since the film was ultimately marketed towards children.

 Box office 

In the U.S. box office, Pokémon: The First Movie was an instant commercial success, debuting at number one and earning $10.1 million on its Wednesday opening day. This day is commonly referred to as the "Pokéflu" because so many children missed school to see the film, much to the chagrin of educators. This was the biggest animated film opening for any film in the history of Warner Bros. The film remained the only anime film to top the U.S. box office until 2021's Demon Slayer: Kimetsu no Yaiba – The Movie: Mugen Train. During its first weekend, it grossed $31 million and went on to generate a total of $50.8 million since its Wednesday launch in 3,043 theaters, averaging to about $10,199 per venue over the three-day span. It also held the record for being the animated feature with the highest opening weekend in November outside of the Thanksgiving holiday. Despite a 59.72% drop in its second weekend to $12.5 million, the film made $67.4 million within 12 days. It closed on February 27, 2000, earning $85.7 million in North America, and $77.9 million in other territories. It is the highest-grossing anime film in the United States and the fourth highest-grossing animated film based on a television show worldwide. It was also the highest-grossing film based on a video game at the time, until 2001's Lara Croft: Tomb Raider. Commercially, Takeshi Shudo states the film fared better overall in the U.S. than it did in its home country.

In the United Kingdom, the film grossed £10.8million at the box office. It is also the highest-grossing Japanese film in France and Germany, where it sold 2,224,432 and 3,222,452 box office admissions, respectively. In total, the film's worldwide box office gross was $172,744,662.

Accolades
At the Stinkers Bad Movie Awards, the film garnered five nominations, of which it won two: Worst Achievement in Animation (OLM, K.K.) and Most Unwelcome Direct-to-Video Release (All nine Pokémon videos released in 1999). However, it lost Biggest Disappointment (Films That Didn't Live Up to Their Hype) to The Blair Witch Project, Worst Screen Debut (all 151 Pokémon) to Jar Jar Binks (played by Ahmed Best) in Star Wars: Episode I – The Phantom Menace, and Worst Screenplay for a Film Grossing More than $100 Million Using Hollywood Math (Takeshi Shudo) to Wild Wild West.

 Legacy 

The film serves as the primary influence on Mewtwo's portrayal in the Super Smash Bros. series of fighting games, in keeping with the anime inspiration for playable Pokémon characters. Mewtwo's playable debut in Super Smash Bros. Melee features Masachika Ichimura reprising his role as Mewtwo from the film, and the Japanese version of the game contains quotes reminiscent of Mewtwo's character in the film. The character's return as a DLC fighter in Super Smash Bros. for Nintendo 3DS and Wii U was heralded by the tagline "Mewtwo Strikes Back!" in a gameplay trailer.

During the end credits of Pokémon the Movie: The Power of Us (2018), it was announced that a CGI remake was set to release on the following year. In December 2018, the release date of the remake was revealed as July 12, 2019. Pokémon fansite Serebii reported that the film, titled Pokémon: Mewtwo Strikes Back — Evolution'', would be directed by Kunihiko Yuyama and Motonori Sakakibara.

On January 22, 2020, it was announced that Netflix would be releasing the English dubbed version of the film.

See also 
 List of films based on video games

Notes

References

External links 

 
 
 
 
 

1998 films
Warner Bros. animated films
Warner Bros. films
1990s adventure films
1990s Japanese-language films
1998 anime films
Films about cloning
Japanese fantasy comedy films
Films directed by Kunihiko Yuyama
Films set on fictional islands
Japanese animated fantasy films
Japanese fantasy adventure films
First Movie
Toho animated films
Films scored by Shinji Miyazaki
OLM, Inc. animated films
1990s children's animated films